The 21st Century Steam program was conducted by the Norfolk Southern Railway from 2011 to 2015, featuring four classic steam locomotives pulling passenger excursions along Norfolk Southern rails in the eastern United States. The last train was to be Southern 4501's Piedmont Limited excursion trip from Atlanta, Georgia, to Toccoa, Georgia (which had been scheduled for October 3 & 4, 2015), but cancelled on October 1 due to Hurricane Joaquin.

Background

In 1966, the Southern Railway, under the leadership of W. Graham Claytor, Jr., operated a popular steam excursion program. The Southern Railway operated some Southern veterans, such as Southern Railway 630, Southern Railway 722, Southern Railway 4501, Savannah & Atlanta 750 as well as leased some locomotives which had served on non-Southern Railway tracks, such as Canadian Pacific 2839, Chesapeake and Ohio 2716 and Texas and Pacific 610. In 1982, the Southern Railway merged with the Norfolk & Western Railway to become Norfolk Southern, which had as its chairman and CEO, Robert B. Claytor, brother of the former Southern Railway president Graham Claytor.  He retained the program. Following the merger, the Norfolk Southern steam program acquired two new locomotives for its fleet: Norfolk & Western 611, which debuted in 1982, and Norfolk & Western 1218, which debuted in 1987.

However, in 1994, Norfolk Southern announced that they will end their steam program because of serious safety concerns, rising insurance costs, the expense of maintaining steam locomotives, and decreasing rail network availability due to a surge in freight traffic. At the time, N&W 1218 was being overhauled in Birmingham, Alabama, so she was cosmetically restored and eventually was sent back to Roanoke, Virginia. Meanwhile, N&W 611 pulled her final excursion from Birmingham to Chattanooga, Tennessee, on December 3 and arrived back in Roanoke four days later. In the end, both N&W 611 & 1218 would wind up on display at the Virginia Museum of Transportation in Roanoke. However, in May 2014, the 611 was removed from display and towed to the North Carolina Transportation Museum in Spencer, North Carolina, to be restored to operating condition once again on March 31, 2015.

Origins
In 2005, Norfolk Southern acquired a new CEO, Charles "Wick" Moorman. Two years later, Moorman traveled to Chattanooga to speak at a gathering of the National Railway Historical Society. Two other members of Norfolk Southern had already been in favor of bringing steam back and while there, Moorman toured the facilities of the Tennessee Valley Railroad Museum (TVRM) and also traveled on one of their excursions. He also met with Tim Andrews, TVRM's president.

Andrews recalled later:  “I told [Moorman] that we would be happy to do whatever we could to help Norfolk Southern with anything they needed…. It was an open-ended conversation, and talk about reintroducing steam developed from there.”

In June 2010, Norfolk Southern announced that it was in negotiations with the TVRM to operate a “limited number” of excursions, noting that the program would “highlight milestones in rail history and provide an opportunity for audiences to learn about today's safe and service-oriented freight railroads.”  As CEO Wick Moorman also explained: "This is the right time for steam to ride the Norfolk Southern rails...We have a fascinating history, and we have a compelling message about how today's railroads support jobs, competition, and the economy.  It is a forward-looking message that resonates with people everywhere."

Excursion Seasons

2011
In March 2011, the restoration of Southern 630 was complete. Over Labor Day weekend, the 630 rolled onto the main line to participate the 21st Century Steam program, pulling two trains daily on September 3 and 4 from the TVRM to one of the train yards in Chattanooga and returning, an event coinciding with the 50th anniversary of the founding of the Museum. Two months later, 630 ran an excursion from Knoxville, Tennessee, to Chattanooga.

2012

In 2012, the 21st Century Steam excursion program was dominated by relatively short employee appreciation excursions in order to commemorate the 30th anniversary of the founding of the Norfolk Southern Railway. Norfolk Southern leased the Nickel Plate 765, operated by the Fort Wayne Railroad Historical Society to help, as well as operating Southern 630.

In June 2012, Southern 630 ran employee excursions in the areas around Atlanta, Georgia, Spencer, North Carolina and Winston-Salem, North Carolina, Roanoke, and Knoxville. Public one-way excursion trips included Winston-Salem to Roanoke, Roanoke to Bristol, Virginia, and Bristol to Knoxville in July. During TVRM's 2012 "Railfest" on September 1 and 2, Southern 630 pulled excursions from Chattanooga to Cleveland, Tennessee, and at the end of the month excursions in the Birmingham area. To finish out the season, on November 10, there was an excursion from Chattanooga to Attalla, Alabama, and on the 11th, an excursion from Chattanooga to Harriman, Tennessee.

Meanwhile, as Southern 630 traveled throughout the South, Nickel Plate Road 765, along with NS 8100 (the Nickel Plate Road heritage unit), pulled employee excursions in the areas around Toledo, Ohio, Bellevue, Ohio, Williamson, West Virginia, Pittsburgh, Pennsylvania, and Harrisburg, Pennsylvania. The locomotive also made a ferry run over the famed Horseshoe Curve near Altoona, Pennsylvania. In September, NKP 765 was back on the rails with NS 1070 (the Wabash Railroad heritage unit) and NS 1072 (the Illinois Terminal Railroad heritage unit) to pull excursions in the St. Louis area.

2013
Southern 630's 2013 excursion season began early, with the locomotive pulling a 13 car public excursion (with the help of two diesel locomotives) from Chattanooga to Attalla on March 2. Other excursions in March were seen in the areas surrounding Bristol, Virginia (Bristol to Radford, Virginia, on March 9 and Bristol to Bulls Gap, Tennessee, on March 10), Roanoke (Roanoke to Walton Furnace, Virginia, on March 16 and Roanoke to Lynchburg, Virginia, on March 16–17), and Norfolk, Virginia (Norfolk to Petersburg, Virginia, on March 23). In April, the locomotive traveled to North Carolina for excursions in Spencer, North Carolina (Spencer to Barber Junction, North Carolina on April 13) and Asheville, North Carolina (Asheville to Old Fort, North Carolina, on April 20–21).

On May 11, Nickel Plate Road 765 went on the rails with NS 8102 (the Pennsylvania Railroad heritage unit) for an employee excursion from Cleveland, Ohio, to Lorain, Ohio, and the “Nickel Plate Limited,” a public excursion from Rocky River, Ohio, to Bellevue, Ohio, the next day. She then did a ferry run to Pennsylvania in order to pull employee excursions from Altoona to Gallitzin, Pennsylvania, on May 18–19 and over Memorial Day Weekend (May 25–27), went with 765, along with NS 8102 and 8098 (the Conrail heritage unit), to pull the “Horseshoe Curve Special,” a public excursion over Horseshoe Curve between Lewistown, Pennsylvania and Gallitzin.

In the first weekend in September 2013, Southern 630 pulled excursion trains between Chattanooga and Cleveland for TVRM's Railfest, along with excursions from Birmingham to the cities of Parrish and Wilton, Alabama later in the month. On August 16, 2013, the Fort Wayne Railroad Historical Society announced plans to operate a late October excursion with Nickel Plate Road 765 between Fort Wayne, Indiana and West Lafayette, Indiana along tracks once owned by the Wabash Railroad and used by their Cannon Ball service (named after the famed song), which ran between Detroit and St. Louis between 1949 and 1971. This  round-trip excursion is the first excursion with 765 out of Fort Wayne since 1993. In November, Southern 630 pulled from Chattanooga to Harriman and Attalla, as well as an excursion between Chattanooga and Asheville, North Carolina.

2014
On April 5, SOU 630 ran the "Radford Rambler" excursion round-trip between Bristol, Virginia, and Radford, Virginia, and the "Lonesome Pine Special" excursion round-trip from Bristol to Bulls Gap, Tennessee, on April 6. After that, the locomotive would operate the "Tri-County Mountaineer" from Grundy, VA to Devon, WV on April 12, 13, and 19.

On May 3 and 4, NKP 765 pulled the "Commodore Vanderbilt" employee special excursion between Elkhart, Indiana and Bryan, Ohio. Then, the locomotive would run another employee special excursion called the "Nickel Plate Limited" from Chicago, Illinois, to Argos, Indiana, on May 10 and 11.

On May 17 and 18, SOU 630 ran the "New Royal Palm" excursion from Cincinnati, Ohio, to Danville, Kentucky. The 630 ran the "Lexington Limited" excursion from Lexington, Kentucky, to Oneida, Tennessee, on May 31 and June 1 along with the Steam Anniversary Special from Chattanooga to Oneida on June 7.

On July 5 and 6, NKP 765 ran Norfolk Southern's employee special called the "Mercury Express" from Detroit, Michigan to Toledo, Ohio, and the "Detroit Arrow" public excursion from Detroit to Fort Wayne, Indiana.

2015
The N&W 611 (which had been restored in 2015 to join the program) ran several excursions during the summer such as "The American" from Manassas, Virginia, to Front Royal, Virginia, on June 6 and 7, "The Cavalier" from Lynchburg, Virginia, to Petersburg, Virginia, on June 13 and 14, "The Powhatan Arrow" from Roanoke to Lynchburg and "The Pelican" from Roanoke to Radford, Virginia, on July 3, 4, and 5.

On June 26, the Southern 4501 ran the "Radford Rambler" excursion from Bristol, Virginia, to Radford, Virginia. On June 27, the locomotive pulled the "Lonesome Pine Special" excursion from Bristol, Tennessee, to Bulls Gap, Tennessee, and ran the "Radford Rambler" excursion again on June 28.

On July 18 and 19, Nickel Plate Road 765 made her first 2015 excursion run from Fort Wayne, Indiana, to Lafayette, Indiana, on the route of the famous Wabash Cannonball.

On July 25 and 26, the locomotive made runs from Youngstown, Ohio, to Ashtabula, Ohio, and returned to Buffalo, New York, for the first time in almost 40 years when she made runs on August 1 and 2 between Buffalo and Corning, New York.

On August 22 and 23, NKP 765 ran the "Lehigh Gorge Special" excursion round-trip from Allentown, Pennsylvania, to Pittston, Pennsylvania, and back. On August 24, the locomotive took a visit to the Steamtown National Historic Site and operated their round-trip excursion from Scranton, Pennsylvania, to Portland, Pennsylvania, on September 5 and 7 during Steamtown's 2015 "Railfest".

On September 12 & 13, 4501 ran an excursion from Chattanooga to Cleveland during TVRM's 2015 "Railfest". On September 26 & 27, the locomotive pulled the "Nancy Hanks Special" excursion from Macon, Georgia, to Tennille, Georgia.

"Fire Up 611!" 
On February 22, 2013, the Virginia Museum of Transportation in Roanoke began looking at the feasibility of restoring No. 611, leading to speculations if the locomotive would join the program.

On June 28, 2013, museum officials said that they would restore 611 if they could raise enough money from people all over the world. The needed work includes repairing the engine truck, preparing a tool car and an auxiliary water tender, applying new safety appliances such as in-cab signals and an event recorder, installing new flues, boiler work, and hydro and fire testing, as well as test runs, inspection, and repairs of the tender, running gears, and air brakes.

NS officials said that if the money could be obtained by October 31, 2013, 611 would join their 21st Century Steam program. A Norfolk Southern spokesman said, “If her supporters bring No. 611 back to life, NS will be eager and excited to this incredible part of rail history to join the 21st Century Steam Program....The return of 611 would represent a great opportunity to celebrate our heritage while educating a new generation about the critical role railroads play in today’s economy." As of late October 2013, the Fire UP 611! committee had enough money to restore the locomotive but fell short of their October 31 goal of $3 million needed to also build a facility where the restoration could take place. Rather than call the restoration off, the Committee decided to keep working to raise the remaining funds needed for the restoration.

On April 16, 2015, Norfolk Southern officially announced that 611 would be used to power several excursion trains during the 2015 season.

References

Bibliography
 

Norfolk Southern Railway
Steam locomotives